Harini may refer to:

 Harini (singer), South Indian film playback singer
 Harini (Kannada actress), actress in Indian Kannada film, active 1950–1968
 Genelia D'Souza, also known as Harini in Kollywood